The 2008 United States Senate special election in Mississippi was held on November 4, 2008. This election was held on the same day of Thad Cochran's re-election bid in the regularly scheduled Class II election. The winner of this special election served the rest of the Senate term, which ended in January 2013. Unlike most Senate elections, this was a non-partisan election in which the candidate who got a majority of the vote won, and if the first-place candidate did not get 50%, a runoff election with the top two candidates would have been held. In the election, no run-off was necessary as Republican nominee and incumbent Republican U.S. Senator Roger Wicker won election to finish the term.

Background 

On December 18, 2007, U.S. Senator Trent Lott resigned in his fourth-term to pursue "something else" in the private sector. He ended up starting his own lobbying firm.

On December 31, 2007, Mississippi governor Haley Barbour appointed U.S. Representative Roger Wicker to the vacant seat. Wicker then began his Senate campaign.

Former Governor Ronnie Musgrove, former U.S. Representative and Secretary of Agriculture Mike Espy, former Jackson mayor Harvey Johnson, Jr., former Governor Ray Mabus, and former Mississippi Attorney General Mike Moore were all considered potential Democratic candidates. Of the five, only Musgrove decided to run. Another Democrat, former congressman Ronnie Shows also decided to run, but withdrew on February 19, 2008  after determining that he could not raise enough funds to effectively campaign against Wicker and Musgrove. Shows gave his endorsement to Musgrove.
There was a dispute about the date on which the special election should occur and whether the governor appointed the interim senator in keeping with state law.

Mississippi law states that Gov. Barbour had 10 days after receiving official notification of the vacancy to appoint an interim senator pending a special election.  Barbour appointed Wicker on December 31, 2007, 13 days after Lott's resignation.

The state Democratic party objected to the timing of the special election.  Barbour set the special election for November 4, 2008. Democrats claimed that he had 10 days to set a special election within 90 days (no later than March 29, 2008 ), and the issue went to court for resolution.

Mississippi Attorney General, Democrat Jim Hood, issued a non-binding opinion that the election must be held within 100 days of Lott's resignation. Hood said that Barbour would be breaking the law if he holds the special election in November 2008.  Hood sued Barbour in court over the issue. Hood wanted the date of the special election to be March 11, the same day as Mississippi's presidential primary.

The state’s chief elections officer, the then-Mississippi Secretary of State, Democrat Eric Clark, backed the governor's position.

Governor Barbour claimed that the definition of "year" in the law in question is 365 days.  Hinds County Circuit Court Judge Bobby DeLaughter ruled that the election must take place no later than March 19.  On February 6, 2008, after Barbour appealed,
the Mississippi Supreme Court reversed Judge Delaughter and ruled that the non-partisan special election may be held on November 4.

Candidates
Note: Mississippi special elections are nonpartisan. Party labels are for informational purposes only.

Democratic Party
 Ronnie Musgrove, former Governor

Republican Party
 Roger Wicker, incumbent U.S. Senator

Withdrew
Ronnie Shows, former Congressman (Democratic Party)

Predictions

Polling

Results

See also 
 2008 United States Senate elections
 Mississippi's 1st congressional district special election, 2008, an election to fill Roger Wicker's former U.S. House of Representatives seat.

References

External links 
 Roger Wicker official campaign website
 Ronnie Musgrove official campaign website
 The Real Roger Wicker site critical of Wicker by the Democratic Senatorial Campaign Committee
 Musgrove Facts site critical of Musgrove by the National Republican Senatorial Committee

Mississippi 2008
Mississippi 2008
2008 Special
Mississippi Special
United States Senate Special
United States Senate 2008